The 2016 Mr. Olympia contest was an IFBB professional bodybuilding competition that was held on September 16–17, 2016, in Las Vegas, Nevada. It was the 52nd Mr. Olympia competition celebrated. Other events at the exhibition included the 212 Olympia Showdown, Fitness Olympia, Figure Olympia, Bikini Olympia, Women's Physique Showdown, Classic Physique Olympia, and Men's Physique Showdown contests.

Results

References

External links 
 Official website

 Mr Olympia: Through the Years

 2016
Mr Olympia
2016 in bodybuilding